Be Your Own Pet is the debut full-length album by American band Be Your Own Pet, released in 2006.

Background 
"Ouch" was inspired by George A. Romero's Dawn of the Dead. The title of the song "Thresher's Flail" is a reference to the Samuel Taylor Coleridge poem Kubla Khan: Huge fragments vaulted like rebounding hail/Or chaffy grain beneath the thresher's flail.

Track listing

References 

Be Your Own Pet albums
2006 debut albums
XL Recordings albums
Ecstatic Peace! albums